DWMY (90.3 FM) was a radio station owned and operated by Bombo Radyo Philippines through its licensee People's Broadcasting Service, Inc. It was formerly known as 90.3 MY from 1989 to 1994 and Star FM from 1994 to 2006, when it went off the air.

References

DWMY
Radio stations established in 1989
Radio stations disestablished in 2006
Defunct radio stations in the Philippines